The Clasico Cruceño is a classic match between Oriente Petrolero and Blooming, both from the city of Santa Cruz de la Sierra, Bolivia. Today it is one of the most heavily contested classics of Bolivian football, with the derby attracting some of the greatest attendances in Bolivian football. It has a history of violence amongst both hooligans and ordinary supporters.

League Matches

2009–present

All League Matches

These are only the league matches, club name in bold indicate win.

Players to have played for both clubs
Please note - this is a non-exhaustive list of players to have played for both clubs

  José Alfredo Castillo
  Lorgio Álvarez
  Joselito Vaca
  Raúl Justiniano
  Andrés Imperiale
  Diego Cabrera
  Álex da Rosa
  Alejandro Schiapparelli
  Rubén Tufiño
  Nicolás Suárez Vaca
  Berthy Suárez
  José Milton Melgar
  José Loayza
  Jose Carlos
  Víctor Hugo Antelo
  Erwin Romero
  Mario Pinedo
  Darwin Peña
  Osvaldo Ozzán
  Martín Menacho

External links
 Oriente Petrolero Site Official
 Blooming Web Official
El Clasico lo mas importante

Oriente Petrolero
Club Blooming
Bolivian football rivalries
1970 establishments in Bolivia